David S. Goodsell, is an associate professor at the Scripps Research Institute and research professor at Rutgers University, New Jersey (joint appointment). He is especially known for his watercolor paintings of cell interiors.

Education 
David Goodsell studied a BSc in biology and chemistry at University of California Irvine. After this, he did a PhD in X-ray crystallography of DNA at the University of California Los Angeles, completed in 1987.

Research 
Since completing his PhD he has worked as a structural biologist at the Scripps Research Institute (with a 2-year period in University of California in 1992-94). His research topics have included the use of structural biology and molecular dynamic simulations to investigate symmetry in protein oligomers, protein-protein interactions and for computer-aided drug design. In particular he is a developer of AutoDock, the most widely-used program used for molecular docking. His main research focus areas are HIV drug resistance and structure and function of bacterial cells.

Illustration 

Goodsell has developed a signature style of scientific drawing. He started painting early in his childhood but did not study art in college. In graduate school, Goodsell became interested in scientific illustration while writing molecular graphics programs to visualize protein and DNA structures.

Goodsell's signature style uses generally very flat shading, with strong and simple colour-schemes. As is typical in medical illustration, the images are simplified representations of the subject that still retain accuracy of the important features. His illustrations fall broadly into two categories: individual proteins, and cellular panoramas.

His images of individual proteins are typically computer generated, cell-shaded space-filling representations of proteins, often with cut-aways to show internal binding sites and cofactors. Conversely, his illustration of cell interiors (sometimes called molecular landscapes) are hand-painted in watercolours. They are typically slices through a cell with highly simplified protein structures in a flat style in order to capture overall organisation without overwhelming detail. These cell interiors are often displayed at an effective 1,000,000x magnification for consistency. The paintings therefore share a consistent style, aiming to make interpretation easy and as intuitive as possible.

His illustrations are published in the "Molecule of the Month" series by the Protein Data Bank, an archive of protein structures. His illustrations are used as teaching tools, in textbooks, in scientific publications, and as journal cover art.

Process 
For individual proteins, Goodsell's illustrations are directly generated from solved protein structures deposited in the PDB using custom computer renderings that he wrote in Fortran (now released as an online illustration tool).

Representations of large macromolecular complexes or crowded cellular environments require interpretation and synthesis of multiple different types of scientific imaging. These include X-ray crystallography and NMR for protein components, cryo electron tomography for larger complexes, and super-res light microscopy and electron microscopy for the cellular environment. In these cases, the focus in on portraying the relative scales, orientations and interactions between the components. In order to portray an accurate degree of crowding background gaps are filled with approximate sized generic proteins so that artistic license used to increase the accuracy of the overall representation.

Bibliography 
In addition to scientific papers, Goodsell is the author of several scientific books with a focus on illustration:

Atomic Evidence: Seeing the Molecular Basis of Life (Springer International, 2016)
Bionanotechnology: Lessons from Nature (J. Wiley and Sons, 2004)
 Our Molecular Nature: The Body's Motors, Machines, and Messages (Springer-Verlag, 1996)

 The Machinery of Life (Springer-Verlag, 1993).

References

External links

Molecule of the Month
MotM Illustrator webtool

Year of birth missing (living people)
Living people
Scientific illustrators
Scripps Research faculty
University of California, Los Angeles alumni
University of California, Irvine alumni
21st-century American biologists
Structural biologists
Information visualization experts